Major General Siri Kanth Korla, PVSM, DSO, MC  (also spelled Sri Kanth Korla) (27 January 1917 – 7 April 2007) was an Indian army officer who served in the Second World War and the Indo-Pakistan War of 1965. He served in the British Indian Army from 1934 to 1947, and the Indian Army from 1947 to 1971. Korla was known as one of the great company commanders of the Burma Campaign, and among the most highly decorated Indian officers of the British Indian Army during the Second World War.

Early life and education
Korla came from a Dogra background and hailed from the Kangra valley, India. He was an alumnus of King George's Royal Indian Military School, Jullunder, and the Indian Military Academy, Dehradun.

Military career

World War II

As a young officer of the 7/10th Baluch Regiment (17th Infantry Division) of the British Indian Army, Korla saw major action against the forces of the Imperial Japanese Army in various episodes of action across Burma. For his gallant actions, he was awarded the Distinguished Service Order (DSO) and the Military Cross - the second and the third highest wartime gallantry awards in the armies of the United Kingdom and the British Empire - besides two Mentions in Dispatches. Lt. (acting Captain) Korla's DSO was announced alongside a Mention in Dispatches in The London Gazette on 23 April 1942. Another Mention in Dispatches for Lt. (acting Captain) Korla was announced in The London Gazette on 28 October 1942. Major (temporary) Korla's Military Cross was announced in The London Gazette on 24 May 1945.

Post-Independence
After the Independence of India in 1947, Korla - then a lieutenant colonel - was given charge of the 2nd battalion, 1st Gorkha Rifles (The Malaun Regiment) (2/1 Gorkha Rifles) of the Indian Army. From 1958 to 1959, in the rank of colonel, Korla served as the Deputy Commandant of the Indian Military Academy. In the Indo-Pakistan War of 1965, as a Major General, Korla commanded the 6th Mountain Division, part of the I Corps. The division saw action in the Battle of Chawinda. 

After the war, from 1968 to 1971, Maj Gen Korla served as the General Officer Commanding (GOC) of the Delhi Area, and retired from the army at this post in 1971. On 26 January 1971, he was awarded the Param Vishisht Seva Medal by the President of India V. V. Giri.

Post-retirement
After retiring from the army, from 1972 to 1976, Korla served as the Director General of the Home Guards in Delhi. In 1975, he relinquished his post as the ceremonial Colonel of the 1st Gorkha Rifles.

References 

British Indian Army officers
Companions of the Distinguished Service Order
Recipients of the Military Cross
Indian military personnel of World War II
Indian Army officers
Indian generals
People from Himachal Pradesh
Military personnel from Himachal Pradesh
People from Kangra district
Military personnel of the Indo-Pakistani War of 1965
Recipients of the Param Vishisht Seva Medal
Indian Military Academy alumni
Indian recipients of the Military Cross
Indian Companions of the Distinguished Service Order